Geopotential height or geopotential altitude is a vertical coordinate referenced to Earth's mean sea level, an adjustment to geometric height (altitude above mean sea level) that accounts for the variation of gravity with latitude and altitude. Thus, it can be considered a "gravity-adjusted height". It is the altitude all aircraft's barometric altimeters are calibrated to.

Definition

Thus geopotential is the gravitational potential energy per unit mass at that elevation.

The geopotential height is:
 
which normalizes the geopotential to  = 9.80665 m/s2, the standard gravity at mean sea level.

Usage

Geophysical sciences such as meteorology often prefer to express the horizontal pressure gradient force as the gradient of geopotential along a constant-pressure surface, because then it has the properties of a conservative force. For example, the primitive equations which weather forecast models solve use hydrostatic pressure as a vertical coordinate, and express the slopes of those pressure surfaces in terms of geopotential height. 

A plot of geopotential height for a single pressure level in the atmosphere shows the troughs and ridges (highs and lows) which are typically seen on upper air charts. The geopotential thickness between pressure levels – difference of the 850 hPa and 1000 hPa geopotential heights for example – is proportional to mean virtual temperature in that layer. Geopotential height contours can be used to calculate the geostrophic wind, which is faster where the contours are more closely spaced and tangential to the geopotential height contours.

The National Weather Service defines geopotential height as:

See also
 Atmospheric model
 Above mean sea level
 Dynamic height

References

Further reading
 Hofmann-Wellenhof, B. and Moritz, H. "Physical Geodesy", 2005. 
 Eskinazi, S. "Fluid Mechanics and Thermodynamics of our Environment", 1975.

External links

Atmospheric dynamics
Vertical position

fr:Hauteur du géopotentiel